Robert James Holt (born October 4, 1959) is a former professional American football player who played Wide receiver in 1982 for the Buffalo Bills. And Is now (2022) a Physical Education Instructor at Gadsden Elementary in New Mexico.

References 

1959 births
Living people
People from Denison, Texas
American football wide receivers
Baylor Bears football players
Buffalo Bills players